Torben Hansen from the Social Democrats
, who became mayor following the 2017 election, attempeted to be re-elected for this election.  The parties of the nationwide red bloc lost a seat and only won 15 of the 31 seats, thus being one short of a majority. Instead of using the left of center majority, that could have been completed, with 2 local left-wing parties, Velfærdslisten and Beboerlisten, who won 1 and 2 seats respectively, the constitution, that would make Torben Hansen, would be across the poltiical spectrum, and ended up including the Social Democrats, Danish Social Liberal Party, Conservatives, Danish People's Party and Venstre.

Electoral system
For elections to Danish municipalities, a number varying from 9 to 31 are chosen to be elected to the municipal council. The seats are then allocated using the D'Hondt method and a closed list proportional representation.
Randers Municipality had 31 seats in 2021

Unlike in Danish General Elections, in elections to municipal councils, electoral alliances are allowed.

Electoral alliances  

Electoral Alliance 1

Electoral Alliance 2

Electoral Alliance 3

Electoral Alliance 4

Electoral Alliance 5

Results

Notes

References 

Randers